Heliotropium curassavicum, commonly called salt heliotrope (among other names), a species of flowering plant in the borage family (Boraginaceae). It is native to much of the Americas, from Canada to Argentina, including the West Indies and Hawaii. It can be found as an introduced, and sometimes invasive, species in Africa, Asia, Australia, and Europe. It thrives in salty soils, such as beach sand, alkali flats, and salt marshes. It is often found in disturbed coastal sites.

Description
This is a perennial herb which can take the form of a prostrate creeper along the ground to a somewhat erect shrub approaching  in height. The stem and foliage are fleshy, with the leaves thick and oval or spade-shaped. The plentiful inflorescences are curled, coiling double rows of small bell-shaped flowers. Each flower is white with five rounded lobes and a purple or yellow throat. The fruit is a smooth nutlet.

Names
Due to its wide geographical range that spans many nations and languages,  Heliotropium curassavicum has been given an assortment of common names. In English, these include seaside heliotrope, salt heliotrope, monkey tail, quail plant and Chinese parsley. In Latin American Spanish, it is known as cola de mico, cola de gama or rabo alacrán. It is called kīpūkai in Hawaii.

Taxonomy
There are five currently recognized varieties. These are:
H. curassavicum var. argentinum - Native to the tropics of South America, including Argentina, Brazil, Paraguay, and Uruguay. 
H. curassavicum var. curassavicum - Globally widespread, native from the eastern U.S. to Argentina, and naturalized on seashores elsewhere.
H. curassavicum var. fruticulosum - Endemic to the San Juan and Mendoza provinces of Argentina.
H. curassavicum var. obovatum - Widespread in western North America and Chihuahua, Mexico.
H. curassavicum var. oculatum - Native from southwestern Utah to Baja California.

References

External links

Jepson Manual Treatment
Calflora photo gallery

curassavicum
Plants described in 1753
Taxa named by Carl Linnaeus
Halophytes
Flora of Hawaii
Flora of North America
Flora of South America